Sri Matsya Narayana Temple is located in Bangalore, in the state of Karnataka, India. The temple is located in Omkar Ashram, in Omkar Hills Bangalore. The temple is located in Omkar Ashram, in Omkar Hills Bangalore.

Importance 
Sri Matsya Narayana Temple is the only temple in Karnataka dedicated to Sri Matsya Narayana Swamy. Matsya Avatar was the first incarnation of Hindu deity Lord Vishnu among the Dashavatara (Ten avataras) of Mahavishnu. Matsya means ‘fish’ in Sanskrit and Matsya avatar is the incarnation of Lord Vishnu in the form of fish. At the end of the first epoch (Satya Yuga), when the world was destroyed by a great flood Matsya Avatar was taken by Lord Vishnu to save humanity and the Vedas from the great deluge.

Matsya Avatar is generally represented as a four-armed deity having the upper half of Maha Vishnu with four arms. Two arms hold shankam (conch shell) and chakram (divine discus) and the other two arms are in abhaya (divine protection) and varada (boon) and the lower half of Matsya (fish).

Worship and festival 
The temple is open for darshan from 7 AM to 12.30 PM and from 4.30 PM to 8PM on Monday to Saturday and on Sundays and holidays, the temple is open for darshan from 7 AM to 8 PM.

The Matsya Narayana temple celebrates the major annual festival on Matsya Jayanti. The annual festival of Matsya Jayanti is  celebrated on Chaitra Shukla Paksha Tritya (Third day of the waxing moon period of the Chaitra month (March- April)) every year.

References 

Hindu temples in Bangalore
Temples dedicated to avatars of Vishnu